John Cheetham (25 March 1904 – 1987) was a Scottish footballer who played in the Football League for Accrington Stanley, Brighton & Hove Albion and Swansea Town.

References

1904 births
1987 deaths
Scottish footballers
Association football forwards
English Football League players
Broxburn United F.C. players
Brighton & Hove Albion F.C. players
West Ham United F.C. players
Eccles United F.C. players
Ashton United F.C. players
Swansea City A.F.C. players
Connah's Quay & Shotton F.C. players
Ashton National F.C. players
Hyde United F.C. players
Accrington Stanley F.C. (1891) players
Stalybridge Celtic F.C. players
Witton Albion F.C. players